Helen Matusevich Oujesky (August 14, 1930 – February 1, 2010) was an American  professor of microbiology at the University of Texas, San Antonio. In this capacity she actively pursued environmental research on pollution of soil and water, particularly of toxic wastes.

In her career span of 45 years in the field of education and research, Oujesky was the recipient of several awards such as from the National Science Foundation, Student Science Training Programs for High School Students, Minority Research Programs for Minority High School Students, and an Intervention Model Program for Girls Using Laboratory Activities in Science, Math and Engineering. On 30 January 1997, her name was incorporated in the Texas Women's Hall of Fame.

Biography
Oujesky was born in Fort Worth, Texas on August 14, 1930. Her parents were Lilly (Krivanek) and Steve Matusevich. After her college graduation in 1951 with a bachelor's degree from the Texas State College for Women (now Texas Woman's University) she started her career as a teacher at Trimble Tech High School in Fort Worth and worked as a chemistry and biology teacher until 1963. She also pursued her higher education at Texas Christian University (TCU) and received a Master of Arts degree in 1965. She was awarded a doctoral degree from the Texas Woman's University (TWU) in 1968.

Oujesky then worked from 1963 to 1965 as a graduate teaching assistant at Texas Christian University in Fort Worth. From 1965 to 1968 she worked as graduate teacher at Texas Woman's University and as assistant professor from 1968 to 1973.

Oujesky joined the University of Texas at San Antonio in 1973 and retired as professor in 2001. She was also on the board of directors of the Texas Academy of Sciences from 1980.

Apart from presenting her research findings at various forums on applied microbial ecology and effects of environmental pollutants on microbial metabolism related to water and land pollution of toxic wastes, she has also lectured on the subject of educational equity for girls and women across the country. She gave a guest lecture at the 5th International Biodeterioration Symposium in Aberdeen, Scotland. She supported pre-college students presenting their scientific work at science fairs and junior science academies. She was also encouraged minority women to participate in the sciences.

Family
Helen Matusevich married Frank Oujesky on 27 December 1951. They had three children – Michael Jerome, David Franklin, and Christopher Aaron. She was predeceased by Christopher and her husband, Frank. She died at the age of 79 on February 1, 2010, and was buried at Mount Olivet Cemetery.

Membership
Oujesky was a member of the following institutions and societies at various stages of her career.
President Altrusa Club San Antonio
Member of board directors Alamo Regional Academy of Sciences & Engineering, San Antonio
San Antonio Women's Celebration & Hall of Fame
Fellow Texas Academy of Sciences
Member American Association for the Advancement of Science
American Association of University Women (as president from 1985 to 1987, and president Texas branch from 1994)
American Society for Microbiology
Society for Industrial Microbiology (on the Education committee from 1976)
Sigma Xi (Alamo chapter president 1985–1986)

References

1930 births
2010 deaths
People from Fort Worth, Texas
Texas Woman's University alumni
Texas Christian University alumni
American microbiologists
University of Texas at San Antonio faculty
Women microbiologists
20th-century American women scientists
21st-century American women scientists
20th-century American scientists
21st-century American scientists
American women academics